Samuel Baldwin Ward (June 8, 1842 - June 3, 1915) was a surgeon who operated in New York City and in Albany. He also published writings in the field of medicine, and was the Dean of Albany Medical College 1905-1914.

Biography
Samuel Baldwin Ward was born in New York City on June 8, 1842. His parents were Lebbeus Baldwin Ward and Abby Dwight (Partridge) Ward. Ward's medical degree was from Georgetown University School of Medicine (1864);
his undergraduate degree was from Columbia University. 

He was a consulting surgeon of the Western Dispensary for Women and Children.

He married Cornelia Augusta Wheeler in 1871, and they had three children. Their daughter, Anna Wheeler Ward, married Henry M. Sage October 29, 1895. The Sages, who together had two daughters, divorced in 1908.

Samuel Baldwin Ward died at his home in Albany, New York on June 3, 1915.

Works
 Progress in Surgery:
 "Hun, Edward Reynolds" in American Medical Biographies

References

1842 births
1915 deaths
Albany Medical College faculty
American surgeons
Columbia University alumni
Georgetown University School of Medicine alumni